Talk to the Hand: Live in Michigan is a live album and DVD concert video release from Canadian band Barenaked Ladies, produced by Morningstar Entertainment, Groovepix, and Desperation Records. The DVD is their third DVD-video release, and their first feature-length concert video offered for sale. The CD is their second widely released live album after Rock Spectacle (1996), not including their management company's sale of most of their live concert recordings via online download or shipped CD-R, several of which saw limited in-store release in certain localities. The concert was recorded at the DTE Energy Music Theatre in Clarkston, Michigan on June 15, 2007 during the BLAM Tour. The video was allegedly shot in conjunction with the local Detroit PBS affiliate, WTVS, with plans to air the special on their station. The special has aired on the Toronto-based Canadian station SUN TV on October 12, 2007.

The DVD is available both separately and packaged together with a CD version in one package, was released on November 6, 2007. Both include 15 songs of the 24 that were performed, an adlib, and several banters. Bonus features on the DVD include a 12-minute "behind the scenes" featurette which mainly features an interview with the band, video from soundcheck featuring "Angry People", and a concert photo montage. The CD runs approximately 68 minutes, while the DVD runs 90 including special features. The video is in 16:9 widescreen format, and 5.1 DTS surround sound, with an option for standard Stereo sound.

The cover art for Talk to the Hand: Live in Michigan is in the same style as that of Barenaked Ladies Are Me / Barenaked Ladies Are Men and its related merchandise, and was designed by Team Macho. The products are sold in eco-friendly packaging composed of 100% post-consumer recycled products, printed with vegetable inks, and wrapped with Bi-Ax transparent film. The disc trays of the DVD-only version are made of PaperFoam, which is produced from potato or tapioca starches, while the CD/DVD combo package contains the discs and booklet in cardboard pockets.

Track listing

CD and DVD releases include ad-libbed banters after "The Old Apartment", "Sound of Your Voice", "Too Little Too Late" and "For You".

Songs performed but not included are "Maybe Katie", "In The Car", "Running out of Ink", "Get In Line", "Tonight is the Night I Fell Asleep at the Wheel" [acoustic], "Alcohol", "It's All Been Done", "Lovers in a Dangerous Time" and "Call and Answer".

References

Barenaked Ladies live albums
Barenaked Ladies video albums
2007 live albums
Live video albums
2007 video albums